Line 80 is a Luxembourgian railway line connecting Rodange to Belgium. It is designated Chemins de Fer Luxembourgeois, but predominantly operated by NMBS/SNCB. The services overlap with those designated as Line 70. On the Belgian side of the border the routes are numbered in the NMBS/SNCB series.
 Line 165 Libramont - Virton - Y Aubange - Athus
 Line 165/1 Y Aubange - Frontière RFNL (Rodange)
 Line 167 (Arlon) - Y. Autelbas - Athus - Frontière RFNL (Rodange)

The routes are all electrified at 25 kV using OHL cf NMBS/SNCB's normal 3 kV DC OHL. This requires NMBS/SNCB to use Class 41xx DMUs.

The following passenger services operate on the line, as of 2019:
 Arlon - MeAthus - Aubange - Virton - Libramont hourly on weekdays by SNCB/NMBS
 Luxembourg - Rodange - Athus 2 trains per hour every day (reduced on Sunday) by CFL
 Virton - Halanzy - Aubange - Rodange 2 pairs of trains in rush hours to connect to Longwy - Luxembourg services

Stations
 Arlon (Belgium)
 Messancy (Belgium)
 Athus (Belgium)
 Rodange
 Aubange (Belgium)
 Halanzy (Belgium)
 Virton (Belgium)

References 

Railway lines in Luxembourg